Software Park Thailand is a government agency under the National Science and Technology Development Agency. It was established to stimulate the development of the Thai software industry. It maintains a close association with the private sector. It is in Pak Kret, Nonthaburi Province.

Other software parks in Thailand 
 E-saan Software Park. Khon Kaen Province
 MISOLIMA Software and Technology Park, Chiang Mai Province
 Software Park Phuket Province
 Samui Software Park. Ko Samui
 Nakhon Ratchasima Province Software Park

See also
 Thailand Science Park
 National Science and Technology Development Agency
 Thailand Board of Investment

References

External links
 Software Park Thailand
 MISOLIMA Software and Technology Park
 Software Park Phuket
 Software Park Korat

Information technology in Thailand
National Science and Technology Development Agency